Sparta was a prominent city-state in ancient Greece.

Sparta may also refer to:

Places
 Sparta, Laconia, a city and municipality in Greece that lies at the site of ancient Sparta

Canada
 Sparta, Ontario, a historic village in Canada
 Sparta, or Sparty-Wharf, a hamlet in Box Grove, Ontario 1850 to 1867

United States
 Sparta, Georgia, a city
 Sparta, Illinois, a city
 Sparta, Indiana, an unincorporated community
 Sparta, Kentucky, a city
 Sparta, Louisiana, an unincorporated community
 Sparta, Michigan, a village
 Sparta, Mississippi, an unincorporated community
 Sparta, Missouri, a city
 Sparta, Buchanan County, Missouri, an unincorporated community
 Sparta, Nebraska, an unincorporated community
 Sparta, New Jersey, a township
 Sparta, New York, a township, Livingston County
 Sparta, North Carolina
 Sparta, Ohio, a village
 Sparta, Tennessee, a city
 Sparta, Wisconsin, a city
 Sparta (town), Wisconsin, a town

Sports
List of sports teams named Spartans

Czech Republic
 Sparta Prague, a Czech multi-sports club:
 AC Sparta Prague, men's football team
 AC Sparta Praha (women), women's football team
 HC Sparta Praha, ice hockey team
 BC Sparta Prague, men's basketball team
 BLC Sparta Prague, women's basketball team
 RC Sparta Prague, rugby union team
 AC Sparta Praha (cycling team)
 Sparta Prague Open, a tennis tournament
 SK Sparta Kolín, a Czech football team
 SK Sparta Krč, a Czech football team

Netherlands
 Sparta-Feyenoord, a Dutch baseball team
 Sparta Rotterdam, a Dutch football team

Norway
 IL Sparta, a Norwegian multi-sport club
 Sparta Warriors, ice hockey team of IL Sparta
 Sparta Amfi, an indoor ice hockey rink, belonging to IL Sparta
 FK Sparta Sarpsborg (2004-2007), later Sarpsborg 08 FF, a Norwegian football team

Poland
 Sparta Brodnica, a Polish football team
 Sparta Janowiec Wielkopolski, a Polish football team
 Sparta Lwów, a Polish football team
 Sparta Oborniki, a Polish football team; See Mariusz Szyszka
 Sparta Szamotuły, a Polish football team
 Sparta Wrocław, a Polish motorcycle speedway team
 Sparta Złotów, a Polish multi-sports club

Other
 Sparta F.C., a Greek football club
 Sparta (athletic club), a Danish athletic club
 CF Sparta, a Moldovan football club
 Sparta, a racehorse which failed to complete the 1848 Grand National

Arts and entertainment
 Sparta (film), a 2022 film directed by Ulrich Seidl
 Ancient Wars: Sparta, a real-time strategy computer game
 Sparta, a fictional planet in the CoDominium series of books by Jerry Pournelle
 Sparta, a fictional planet in the novel A Spartan Planet by A. Bertram Chandler
 "This is Sparta!", an internet meme originating from the film 300

Music
 Sparta (album), an album by M.O.P.
 Sparta (band), a band formed by ex-members of At the Drive-In
 "Sparta", a song by Sabaton From The Last Stand

Other uses
 Sparta (mythology), mythical first queen of Sparta, eponym of the city-state
 SPARTA, Inc., a United States defense contractor
 Sparta (moth), a genus of moth
 Sparta (rocket), an Australian rocket
 Sparta (ship), a Russian fishing trawler
 Sparta, the nickname for a Panthera spelaea cub discovered preserved in permafrost

See also
 Duke of Sparta, title of the heir apparent to the Greek throne
 Spartoi or Sparti, a group of mythical beings figuring in the founding myths of the ancient Greek city of Thebes
 Nueva Esparta, a state in Venezuela
 Nueva Esparta, El Salvador
 Esparta, a municipality in the Honduras
 Isparta, a city in Turkey
 Sparta Township (disambiguation)
 Spartak (disambiguation)
 Spartan (disambiguation)
 Spata (disambiguation)
 Laconia (disambiguation)